Dodecamethylcyclohexasilane is the organosilicon compound with the formula . It is one of the more readily prepared and easily handled polysilanes. Dodecamethylcyclohexasilane is produced by reduction of dimethyldichlorosilane with sodium-potassium alloy:

where M is Na or K. The reaction also produces polydimethylsilane and decamethylpentasilane.

The chair conformer was confirmed by X-ray crystallography.

Reactions
Dodecamethylcyclohexasilane reacts with potassium tert-butoxide to give the potassium derivative:

References

Carbosilanes
Silanes